The Interim Biogeographic Regionalisation for Australia (IBRA) is a biogeographic regionalisation of Australia developed by the Australian government's Department of Sustainability, Environment, Water, Population, and Communities. It was developed for use as a planning tool, for example for the establishment of a national reserve system. The first version of IBRA was developed in 1993–94 and published in 1995.

Within the broadest scale, Australia is a major part of the Australasia biogeographic realm, as developed by the World Wide Fund for Nature. Based on this system, the world is also split into 14 terrestrial habitats, of which eight are shared by Australia. The Australian land mass is divided into 89 bioregions and 419 subregions. Each region is a land area made up of a group of interacting ecosystems that are repeated in similar form across the landscape.

IBRA is updated periodically based on new data, mapping improvements, and review of the existing scheme. The most recent version is IBRA7, developed during 2012, which replaced IBRA6.1.

IBRA regions and subregions
This is a list of region and subregions under IBRA7. Region codes are given in parentheses, followed by area, where known. Images of regions are from IBRA6.1, pending creation of maps for IBRA7.

A

B

C

D

E

F

G

H

I

J

K

L

M

N

O

P

R

S

T

V

W

Y

See also
 Ecoregions in Australia
 Integrated Marine and Coastal Regionalisation of Australia (IMCRA)

Further reading
  (Discusses IBRA regions most likely to benefit from targeted floral sampling)

References

Additional references 

 
 Interim Biogeographic Regionalisation for Australia (IBRA7) regions and codes.
 Interim Biogeographic Regionalisation for Australia (IBRA7) subregions and codes.

 
Biogeography of Australia
 01
Botany in Australia
Natural history of Australia
Vegetation of Australia